TC Energy Tower (formerly TransCanada Tower) is a high-rise office building located at 450 1 Street SW in the downtown core of Calgary, Alberta, Canada. It was designed by the architectural firm Cohos Evamy. The tower overlooks James Short Park.

The TC Energy Tower houses the head offices of TC Energy (formerly TransCanada Corporation).

See also
List of tallest buildings in Calgary

Gallery

References

External links
TC Energy Tower

Skyscrapers in Calgary
TC Energy
Skyscraper office buildings in Canada
Office buildings completed in 2001
Dialog (architectural firm) buildings
2001 establishments in Alberta